Maureen Sander-Staudt is a professor of philosophy at Southwest Minnesota State University, in Marshall, MN, US.  She earned her PhD in philosophy from the University of Colorado-Boulder in 2002, and worked in the Department of Integrated Studies at Arizona State University from 2003-2011.  She specializes in feminist ethics and the ethics of care.   She has co-published two anthologies, including Philosophical Inquiry into Pregnancy, Childbirth and Mothering: Maternal Subjects, with Sheila Lintott. New York, NY: Routledge Publishers, 2012, and Applying Care Ethics to Business with Maurice Hamington, New York, NY:  Springer Publishers, 2011. 

Her published articles include:
“Care Ethics and Confucian Reciprocity”  in Care Ethics and Political Theory, Engster and Hamington, ed.s, Oxford University Press, 2015; 
"Care as a Corporate Virtue" in Applying Care Ethics to Business, 2011; 
“On Public Breast-feeding and Male Lactation”, in Motherhood: Philosophy for Everyone:  The Birth of Wisdom, Sheila Lintott (ed.), (New York:  WileyBlackwell) 2011; 
“Reassembling the Assembly:  Care and Political Agency”, Journal of Social Philosophy, Summer, 39 (2), 269-90, 2008; 
and “The Unhappy Marriage of Care Ethics and Virtue Ethics”, Hypatia, 21.4, Fall, 21-40, 2006.

Year of birth missing (living people)
Living people
Southwest Minnesota State University faculty